Johann André Luc Charpenet (born 3 August 1976) is a French former professional footballer who played as a central defender.

Career
Charpenet was born in Roanne, Loire. During his career in France, he represented Olympique Lyonnais, Nîmes Olympique, CS Sedan Ardennes and Stade Brestois 29. He spent most of his days in Ligue 2, only amassing 11 Ligue 1 appearances (six for Lyon in two years, and five with Sedan during the 2002–03 season).

Already aged 31, Charpenet moved to Spain, with Racing de Ferrol and Polideportivo Ejido. In January 2010 he signed with Elche CF in the second division, retiring in June of the following year after one year in French amateur football.

External links

1976 births
Living people
Sportspeople from Roanne
French footballers
Footballers from Auvergne-Rhône-Alpes
Association football defenders
Ligue 1 players
Ligue 2 players
Olympique Lyonnais players
Nîmes Olympique players
CS Sedan Ardennes players
Stade Brestois 29 players
Segunda División players
Segunda División B players
Racing de Ferrol footballers
Polideportivo Ejido footballers
Elche CF players
French expatriate footballers
French expatriate sportspeople in Spain
Expatriate footballers in Spain